Milagros is a given name which may refer to:

Milagros Cabral (born 1978), Dominican volleyball player
Milagros Cerrón (born 2004), Peruvian sirenomelia survivor
Milagros Crespo (born 1979), Cuban beach volleyball player
Milagros Flores, professional name of Argentine actress and singer María de los Milagros Flores (born 1990)
Milagros Hernando (1957–2017), Spanish diplomat
Milagros D. Ibe, Filipino academic, teacher and educator
Milagros Moy (born 1975), Peruvian volleyball player
Ana Milagros Parra, Venezuelan political scientist

Spanish feminine given names